Bilson Halt railway station is a disused railway station opened on the former Bullo Pill Railway, later known as the Great Western Railway Forest of Dean Branch.

History

The Halt, which was just to the south of Letchers Bridge and Bilson Junction/Yard was located about 4 miles 61 chains from Newnham on a 1 in 1280 gradient.

The station opened for passenger services when they were introduced in August 1907, the low platform was constructed from wood and two pagoda style buildings were provided from the outset.

The Halt temporarily served Cinderford until the Bilson loop was opened which allowed trains to run into the Severn and Wye station that was closer to the town.

The halt remained in unadvertised use until 1944, when it was finally removed.

Services

References

Further reading

Disused railway stations in Gloucestershire
Former Great Western Railway stations
Railway stations in Great Britain opened in 1907
Railway stations in Great Britain closed in 1944